Başkale is a town and district located in south-eastern Turkey in Van Province. There is one municipality in the Başkale district, the town centre, which was established in 1937. The neighbourhoods of the town of Başkale are: Tepebaşı, Yeni mahalle, Camii-Kebir, Samandöken, Cevkan, Kale, Hafıziye, Tarım, and Yakınyol. In the local elections of March 2019 Erkan Acar from the Peoples' Democratic Party (HDP) was elected mayor.

Geography
Başkale shares district borders with Yüksekova district of Hakkari Province to the south, Saray and Özalp districts of Van Province to the north, and Gürpınar district of Van Province to the west.

Başkale is situated 2460 metres above sea level, in the valley of the Great Zab River (Zapsuyu), and the town stands on the eastern slope of the south-eastern Taurus Mountains. The majority of the  Başkale district is mountainous. The agricultural portion is only , approximately 14% of the total area. Başkale is enclosed by Mount (Yiğit)/Haravil (3468 m) in the east, Mount Başkale/İspiriz (3668 m) in the west, and Mount Gökdağ (3604 m) in the south-east. The mountains of Mor, Haravil, Mengene and Çekvan are in the district of Başkale. Other geographical features in Başkale include the Karasu river, and the plateaus of Nebirnav, Kevçikan, Hanasor, Çekvan, Aşkitan (Ülya), Perihan, Meydan, Harinan, Terazın, Sülav, Medgezeren, Pistekan, Herevil-Şirez, Derevan, Derik, Bağarük, Düava and Mengen.

Demographics
According to Encyclopædia Britannica Eleventh Edition from 1911, the town included 10 thousand people, mostly consisting of Kurds but also 1.5 thousand Armenians and 1 thousand Jews.

References

Further reading

Towns in Turkey
Populated places in Van Province
Districts of Van Province
Kurdish settlements in Turkey